Bassersdorf is a railway station in the Swiss canton of Zurich and the municipality of Bassersdorf. The station is located on the Zurich to Winterthur main line, to the east of where the Zürich Airport and Kloten lines diverge. It is an intermediate stop on the Zurich S-Bahn services S7 and S24.

The original route of the railway was through the centre of Bassersdorf. But with the construction of a new railway to serve Zürich Airport in 1980, this route was abandoned along with the original Bassersdorf railway station.

Gallery

References

External links 
 
 

Bassersdorf
Bassersdorf